The following list is of events that happened during 2013 in Kenya.

Incumbents
President: Mwai Kibaki (until 9 April), Uhuru Kenyatta (starting 9 April)
Deputy President: Kalonzo Musyoka (until 9 April), William Ruto (starting 9 April)
Chief Justice: Willy Mutunga
Speaker of the Senate: Ekwe Ethuro (starting 28 March)

Events
 September 21 – al-Shabaab Islamic militants attack the Westgate shopping mall in Nairobi, Kenya, killing at least 62 civilians and wounding over 170.

Deaths

References